Ta Ho Tun is a village in Sai Kung District, Hong Kong. It comprises Ta Ho Tun Ha Wai and Ta Ho Tun Sheung Wai.

Administration
Ta Ho Tun is a recognized village under the New Territories Small House Policy.

References

External links
 Delineation of area of existing village Ta Ho Tun (Sai Kung) for election of resident representative (2019 to 2022)

Villages in Sai Kung District, Hong Kong